The 2014–15 Saint Francis Red Flash men's basketball team represented Saint Francis University during the 2014–15 NCAA Division I men's basketball season. The Red Flash, led by third year head coach Rob Krimmel, played their home games at the DeGol Arena and were members of the Northeast Conference. They finished the season 16–16, 9–9 in NEC play to finish in a tie for fifth place. They advanced to the semifinals of the NEC tournament where they lost to St. Francis Brooklyn. They were invited to the CollegeInsider.com Tournament where they lost in the first round to Bowling Green.

Roster

Schedule

|-
!colspan=9 style="background:#990000; color:#FFFFFF;"| Regular season

|-
!colspan=9 style="background:#990000; color:#FFFFFF;"| NEC tournament

|-
!colspan=9 style="background:#990000; color:#FFFFFF;"| CIT

References

Saint Francis Red Flash men's basketball seasons
Saint Francis (PA)
Saint Francis Red Flash men's basketball
Saint Francis Red Flash men's basketball
Saint Francis